Inteha-e-Ishq is a Pakistani drama television series aired on A-Plus TV from September 2021 to April 2022. It is directed by Dilawar Malik and features Hiba Bukhari and Junaid Khan in leading roles.

Plot 
Rida and Saim are cousins and love each other, both want to marry each other and everyone except Saim's mother, Naseema, is supportive. She clearly forbids Rida's parents to make her daughter-in-law. On the engagement fixation of Rida, Saim tells everyone that she loves Rida. Due to all this drama, Rida's father's health deteriorates and he is shifted to hospital where Doctor Daniyal (a man who is smitten by Rida's beauty in market days before) treats him. Saim's father, Saeed, rebukes Naseema due to her schemes that cause the current condition of Rida's father. Saim is exhausted and tries to go abroad. However, Saeed has Rida and Saim engaged. Dr. Daniyal feels hurt when he learns that Rida is soon to marry.

Cast 
 Hiba Bukhari
 Junaid Khan
 Arez Ahmed
 Sara Aijaz
 Beena Chaudhary
 Ismat Iqbal
 Samia Butt
 Asad Mehmood
 Maria Malik

References

Pakistani television series
2021 Pakistani television series debuts
2022 Pakistani television series endings